River Skirfare is a small river in North Yorkshire, England, that flows through Littondale and ends where it joins the larger River Wharfe. The source is the confluence of Foxup Beck and Cosh Beck at the hamlet of Foxup.

The name is of Old Norse origin, from skírr "bright" or "clear" and far "river-course".

Course

The source of the river is the confluence of Foxup Beck and Cosh Beck at the hamlet of Foxup. To the east bank lays Hawkswick Moor and on the west bank lays Darnbrook Fell, Hawkswick Clowder and Pen-y-ghent Fell.

Natural history

The flora and fauna found along the river are similar to that found along the nearby River Wharfe.

Economy

The economy of the area around the river are similar to that found along the nearby River Wharfe.

Lists

Tributaries

From the source of the river:

 Halton Gill Beck
 Newshot Gill
 Hesleden Beck
 Potts Beck
 Fosse Beck
 Cowside Beck
 Cote Gill
 Sleets Gill Beck
 Moss Beck

Settlements

From the source of the river:

Foxup
Halton Gill
Hesleden
Litton
Arncliffe
 Arncliffe Cote
Hawkswick

Crossings

From the source of the river:

 Foxup Bridge
 Halton Gill Bridge
 Unnamed bridge to Nether Hesleden
 Fording point
 New Bridge on farm track
 Footbridge near Litton
 Fording point south of Litton
 Arncliffe Bridge
 Footbridge north of Hawkswick
 Hawkswick Bridge
 Skirfare Bridge on B6160

Gallery

References

Sources

 OS Landranger Map Wensleydale & Upper Wharfedale Sheet 98
 OS Explorer Map Yorkshire Dales: N & Cen areas Sheet OL30

Skirfare